Revival most often refers to:

Resuscitation of a person
Language revival of an extinct language
Revival (sports team) of a defunct team
Revival (television) of a former television series
Revival (theatre), a new production of a previously produced work
Resurrection and reincarnation, alternatively known as revival of the dead
De-extinction or revival of an extinct species 

Revival or The Revival may also refer to:

Books and comics
Revival (comics), a 2012–2017 series by Tim Seeley and Mike Norton
Revival (novel), a 2014 novel by Stephen King

Film and television
Revival (2013 film), a Czech comedy film
The Revival: Women and the Word, a 2016 American documentary
The Revival (film), a 2017 American drama film
"Revival" (Death Note), a television episode
"Revival" (The Outer Limits), a television episode

Music 
Revival (quartet), an American barbershop quartet
Revival Records, a British record label

Albums 
Revival (As Hell Retreats album) or the title song, 2010
Revival (Bellowhead album), 2014
Revival (Core album), 1996
Revival (Eminem album) or the title song, 2017
Revival (Gillian Welch album), 1996
Revival (Hugh Masekela album), 2005
Revival (John Fogerty album), 2007
Revival (Jully Black album), 2007
Revival (Light the Torch album), 2018
Revival (Petra album), 2001
Revival (Reverend Horton Heat album) or the title song, 2004
Revival (Selena Gomez album) or the title song (see below), 2015
Revival (Soulfire Revolution album) or the title song, 2013
Revival (Tara Oram album), 2011
Revival (The Answer album), 2011
Revival (Vancouver Sleep Clinic album) or the title song, 2017
Revival (Live at the Gillioz), a concert film by the Ozark Mountain Daredevils, 2008
The Revival (Tony! Toni! Toné! album), 1990
 Revival, a 1998 album by The Congos
 Revival, a 1995 album by Dance 2 Trance
 Revival, a 1989 album by David Mullen
 Revival, a 1991 album by Edin-Ådahl
 Revival, a 1977 album by George Coleman
 Revival, a 2017 album by Johnny Reid
 Revival, a 2003 album by Katchafire
 Revival, a 2001 album by Postmen
 Revival, a 1969 album by Q65
 Revival, a 2000 album by Reid Paley
 Revival, a 2017 album by Third Day
 The Revival, an EP by Royce da 5'9" released ahead of the album Street Hop, 2009

Songs 
"Revival" (Deerhunter song), 2010
"Revival" (Eurythmics song), 1989
"Revival" (Selena Gomez song), 2015
"Revival (Love Is Everywhere)", by the Allman Brothers Band, 1970
"Revival", by CIX, 2020
"Revival", by Gregory Porter, 2020
"Revival", by Orgy from Candyass, 1998
"Revival", by Sara Evans from Slow Me Down, 2014
"Revival", by Sigala from Brighter Days, 2018
"Revival", by Soulsavers from It's Not How Far You Fall, It's the Way You Land, 2007
"The Revival", by the Dear Hunter from Act V: Hymns with the Devil in Confessional, 2016

Politics 
Democratic Revival, a Greek political party
Revival Party, a political party in Iran between 1920 and 1960
Revival (Bulgarian political party), founded 2014
Revival Party (Moldova), a left-wing political party in Moldova
Revival (Ukraine) (also translatable as Renaissance), a right-wing Developmentalist political party in Ukraine
Aitaira (Revival), a political party in Abkhazia

Religion 
Celtic Revival
Christian revival, a revival of religious fervor or fervent traditions
Revival meeting, a series of Christian religious services held in order to inspire active members of a church body or to gain new converts
Revival Centres International, a church group
Islamic revival, an ongoing process since the 1970s
Hindu revivalism

Other uses 
Revival, Jamaica, a settlement in Westmoreland Parish
The Revival (professional wrestling) or FTR, a professional wrestling team
The Revival (UK magazine), a magazine for British Muslims
Revival FM, a Christian-based radio station in Scotland

See also 
Islamic Renaissance Party of Tajikistan or Islamic Party of Revival
Revivalism (architecture), the use of visual styles that consciously echo the style of a previous architectural era
Revivalistics
Revive (disambiguation)
Palingenesis
Renaissance